Kevin Rader may refer to:

 Kevin Rader (politician) (born 1968), American politician
 Kevin Rader (American football) (born 1995), American football tight end